Great Western Cities is an initiative launched jointly in February 2015 by the cities of Bristol, in England, and Cardiff and Newport, in Wales, to improve cooperation in the area as a city region, and to develop economic and environmental partnerships.

The three cities are located on the Severn estuary and are linked by the M4 and M48 road bridges, and by rail via the Severn Tunnel.   The joint initiative followed publication of a report in 2014, Unleashing Metro Growth, which proposed greater collaboration between cities and identified the Severn region as a ‘power-house city region’ critical to the UK economy as a whole.

At the launch of the Great Western Cities initiative on 4 February 2015, it was said that the cities had a combined economic output of £58 billion, but could improve their competitiveness by better joint working.   It was said that "investment in the region must focus on improving connectivity, realising the energy potential of the Severn Estuary and Bristol Channel and promoting the region as a high-quality destination for international business."

Phil Bale of Cardiff City Council said that if the initiative did not go ahead "Cardiff would lose jobs and investment."   Bristol's mayor, George Ferguson, said that the cities were, together, "the best economic powerhouse outside London."  The Welsh Secretary Stephen Crabb said that: "By working together our great cities can pack a bigger economic punch to support business and private enterprise."

The toll on Severn Bridge was scrapped on 17th Dec 2018 onwards. While scrapping the toll, the Welsh secretary, Alun Cairns expressed his hope that:

References

External links
 Royal Society for the encouragement of Arts, Manufactures and Commerce - City Growth Commission
 City Growth Commission Unleashing Metro Growth - Final Recommendations, October 2014

Economy of Bristol
Economy of Cardiff
Newport, Wales
Regionalism (politics) in the United Kingdom